Edward Williams (born July 26, 1942) is an American biathlete. He competed in the 20 km individual event at the 1968 Winter Olympics.

References

1942 births
Living people
American male biathletes
Olympic biathletes of the United States
Biathletes at the 1968 Winter Olympics
Sportspeople from Kingston, New York